It Was a Dark and Stormy Night (Italian: Era una notte buia e tempestosa...) is a 1985 Italian comedy film directed by Alessandro Benvenuti.

Cast
Alessandro Benvenuti as Felix
Athina Cenci as Valentina
Daniele Trambusti as Riccardino
Maria Rosaria Omaggio as Lilian
Giovanni Chinnici Botta as Amedeo
Clara Colosimo as Fernanda
Maurizio Dami as Billicioni
Michelangelo Lo Prete as the Boss

References

External links

1985 films
1980s Italian-language films
1985 comedy films
Italian comedy films
Films directed by Alessandro Benvenuti
1980s Italian films